Dashain or Bada'dashain, also referred as Bijaya Dashami in Sanskrit, is a major Hindu religious festival in Nepal. It is also celebrated by Hindus of Nepal and elsewhere in the world, including among the Lhotshampa of Bhutan and the Burmese Gurkhas of Myanmar. The festival is also referred as Nauratha, derived from the Sanskrit word for the same festival Navaratri which translates to Nine Nights. A version of this festival is celebrated as Navaratri, Dussehra or Dashera by Hindus in India, although rites and rituals vary significantly. 

It is the longest and the most auspicious festival in the Bikram Sambat and Nepal Sambat annual calendars, celebrated by Nepali Hindus, along with their diaspora throughout the globe. In Nepal, it is also known as the biggest festival in the country and is the longest national/public holiday, 5 days to be exact. It is the most anticipated festival in Nepal. People return from all parts of the world, as well as different parts of the country, to celebrate together. All government offices, educational institutions, and other offices remain closed during the festival period. The festival falls in September or October, starting from the shukla paksha (bright lunar night) of the month of Ashwin and ending on Purnima, the full moon. Among the fifteen days on which it is celebrated, the most important days are the first, seventh, eighth, ninth, tenth, and fifteenth. 
Dashain is the main festival of Hindus in Nepal.

Etymology

The word Vaḍādaśain̐ is a Nepali sandhi, where "baḍā" means "important" and "daśa͠i" means "tenth", implying the most-significant final day of the festival of Durga Puja, celebrating the dawn after the end of Nauratha (nine nights). The word Dashain is ultimately derived from the Sanskrit word daśamī, denoting the 10th day of the Kaula (month) in this context.

Significance
For followers of Shaktism, it represents the victory of the goddess Durga. In Hindu scripture, the demon Mahishasura had created terror in the devaloka (the world where gods lives) but Durga killed the devils also known as demons. The first nine days of Dashain symbolize the battle which took place between the different manifestations of Durga and Mahishasura. The tenth day is the day when Durga finally defeated him. For other Hindus, this festival symbolises the victory of Ram over Ravan as recounted in the Ramayana. It symbolises the victory of good over  evil.

Day 1: Ghatasthapana

Ghaṭasthāpanā ("sowing Jamara") marks the beginning of Dashain. Literally, it means placing a kalasha or a pot, which symbolizes goddess Durga. Ghaṭasthāpanā falls on the first day of the festival. On this day the Kalash is filled with holy water and is then sewn with barley seeds. Then the Kalash is put in the center of a rectangular sand block. The remaining bed of sand is also seeded with grains. The priest then starts the puja by asking Durga to bless the vessel with her presence. This ritual is performed at a certain auspicious time which is determined by the astrologers. The goddess is believed to reside in the vessel during Navaratri.

The room where all this is done is known as the Dashain Ghar. Traditionally, outsiders are not allowed to enter it. A family member worships the Kalash twice every day, once in the morning and then in the evening. The Kalash is kept away from direct sunlight and holy water is offered to it every day so that by the tenth day of the festival the seed will have grown to five or six inches long yellow grass. This sacred grass is known as jamara. These rituals continue until the seventh day.

Day 7: Phulpati  
Phulpati is a major celebration occurring on the seventh day of Dashain. The word Phulpati is made up of two words: phūl meaning flower and pātī meaning leaf. 

Hundreds of government officials gather together in the Tundikhel grounds in conventional formal dress to witness the event. The king used to observe the ceremony in Tundikhel while the Phulpati parade was headed towards the Hanuman Dhoka royal palace. Then there is a majestic display of the Nepalese Army along with a celebratory firing of weapons that continues for ten to fifteen minutes honoring Phulpati. The Phulpati is taken to the Hanuman Dhoka Royal Palace by the time the occasion ends in Tundikhel, where a parade is held.

Since 2008, when the royal family was overthrown, the two-century-old tradition is changed so that the holy offering of Phulpati goes to the residence of the president. The President has taken over the king's social and religious roles after the end of the monarchy.

In various other cities and towns across Nepal and in India (with a significant Nepali population), a Phulpati procession is carried out. Flowers, fruits and holy symbols are tied in a red cloth, which is then covered with an auspicious red shawl and carried on a decorated wooden log across the town. The townspeople offer flower and fruits as the procession passes through their houses. The process is also accompanied by traditional Naumati instruments.

Day 8: Maha Asthami 
The eighth day is called Maha Asthami. This is the day when the most fierce of Goddess Durga's manifestations, the bloodthirsty Kali, is appeased through the sacrifice of buffaloes, goats, hens, and ducks in temples throughout the nation. Blood, symbolic of its fertility, is offered to the Goddesses. Appropriately enough, the night of this day is called Kal Ratri (Black Night), after the form of Durga worshipped on this day. . It is also the norm for buffaloes to be sacrificed in the courtyards of all the land revenue offices in the country on this day. The old palace in Kathmandu Durbar Square is active throughout the night with worship and sacrifices in almost every courtyard. 

On midnight of the very day of the Dashain, a total of 54 buffaloes and 54 goats are sacrificed in observance of the rites. After the offering of the blood, the meat is taken home and cooked as "prasad", or food blessed by divinity. This food is offered in tiny leaf plates to the household gods, then distributed amongst the family. Eating this food is thought to be auspicious. While the puja is being carried out, great feasts are held in the homes of common people. On this day the Newar People has an event called "Khadga Puja" where they do puja of their weapons. It is when they put on tika and get blessings from elders.

Day 9: Maha Navami 
The ninth day of Dashain is called Maha Navami, "the great ninth day". This is the last day of Navaratri. Ceremonies and rituals reach a peak on this day. On this day, official military ritual sacrifices are held in one of the Hanuman Dhoka royal palaces, the Kot courtyard. On this occasion, the state offers the sacrifices of buffaloes under the gunfire salutes. This day is also known as the demon-hunting day because members of the defeated demon army try to save themselves by hiding in the bodies of animals and fowls.

On Maha Navami, durga, the mother goddess Devi, is worshipped as it is believed that all the things which help us in making a living should be kept happy. Artisans, craftsmen, traders, and mechanics worship and offer animal and fowl blood to their tools, equipment, and vehicles. Moreover, since it is believed that worshipping the vehicles on this day avoids accidents for the year all vehicles from bikes, and cars to trucks are worshipped on this day.

The Taleju Temple gates are opened to the general public on only this day of the year. Thousands of devotees go and pay respect to the goddess this day. The temple is filled with devotees all day long.

Day 10: Bijaya Dashami 

The tenth day of the festival is the 'Bijayadashami'. On this day, a mixture of rice, yogurt and vermilion is prepared. This preparation is known as "tika". Often Dashain tika time is different every year. Elders put this tika and jamara which is sown in the Ghatasthapana on the forehead of younger relatives to bless them with abundance in the upcoming years. The red also symbolizes the blood that ties the family together. 

Elders give "Dakshina", or a small amount of money, to younger relatives at this time along with the blessings. This continues to be observed for five days till the full moon during which period families and relatives visit each other to exchange gifts and greetings. This ritual of taking tika from all the elder relatives (even the distant relatives) helps in the renewal of the community ties greatly. This is one reason why the festival is celebrated with so much vigour and enthusiasm.

Day 11: Papakunsha Ekadashi 
Ekadashi is the eleventh day of the lunar fortnight in Hindu calendar. Ekadashis are considered a very auspicious day and people usually fast on this day. The day after Bijaya Dashami is known as Papakunsha Ekadashi. On this day, it is customary to wake up early in the morning and start fasting till evening, after washing and wearing clean clothes. It is also customary to listen to Papakunsha Ekadashi stories and to visit religious sites.While in some parts of the Nepal, the tika is only received on the day of Bijaya Dashami, in other parts of the country, people start visiting their extended family and relatives on this day till Kojagrat Purnima. One is supposed to eat only Sattvic diet during Ekadashis, but people continue their Dashain feasts on this day too, so this Ekadashi is also known as Gidde Ekadashi (lit. Vulture–like–Ekadashi). By donating gold, sesame, barley, grain, soil, umbrella, shoes, etc. on this day, it is believed that one will get heaven after death.

Day 15: Kojagrat Purnima 
The festival's last day, which lies on the full moon day, is called Kojagrat Purnima or Sharad Purnima. The literal meaning of Kojagrat is 'who is awake'. On this day Goddess Laxmi who is believed to be the goddess of wealth is worshipped as it is believed that Goddess Laxmi descends on earth and showers whoever is awake all night with wealth and prosperity. People enjoy the night by playing cards and much more.

Animal sacrifices are often the norm during this time, as the festival commemorates the bloody battles between the "divine" and "demonic" powers. The proponents of animal killing interpret this sacrificial act as the symbolic sacrifice of our animal qualities, but those who are opposed to animal sacrifice stress that the sacrificial act is nothing but an excuse to fulfill the appetite for food/meat.

Related traditions

Music 
The Malshree dhoon is incorporated into mainstream Nepalese music as the music of Dashain. It is the tune that announces the Dashain has arrived. Malashree dhoon is one of the oldest surviving devotional music of Newa art form, with its origin in the 17th century. In due time and also the fact that Dashain happens to be celebrated not just by Newars but by all Nepalese, this dhoon caught up and now is part of the national culture and played during Dashain.

Mantra 
While putting tika to the younger family members or relatives, the elder people usually recite special Sanskrit mantras as a blessing. There are two main mantras that are recited while putting tika on the Bijaya Dashami day, one for men and one for females.

In the mantra for male members, the qualities of various Hindu mythical heroes (Yudhishthira, Balarama, etc.) as well as antiheroes (Ashwatthama and Duryodhana) are blessed to the person.

In the mantra for the female members, they are worshipped as various form of goddess Durga.

Alongside these mantra, other blessings for good health and fortune are also given.

Games and carnivals 

As Dashain approaches, kite flying becomes more and more common. Riding kites has been a very important part of celebrating Dashain in the country, as it is considered to be one way of reminding God not to send rain anymore. During the festival people of all ages fly kites from their roofs. Colourful kites and voices shouting out 'changā chet' (this phrase is usually used when one cuts the other person's kite string) fill the days during the festival.

Playing cards is another way of celebrating Dashain. While children are busy flying kites during Dashain, the older members of the family pass their time by getting together and playing cards with each other for money and fun.

Bamboo swings are constructed in many parts of the country as a way of celebration. Dashain swings are called 'ping' in Nepali. They present the best of local culture, tradition, community spirit, and fun. These swings are constructed by community members with traditional methods which use ropes made from tough grass, bamboo sticks and wood, etc. The swings are normally constructed a week before Ghatasthapana and dismantled only after the festival of Tihar which comes after Dashain. The height of some swings exceeds twenty feet. People of all ages enjoy the swings. They are especially famous with children.

Fairs and celebrations are organized during the festival. Usually, small fairs are organized in the villages with Ferris wheels for children and other entertainment for adults. However, in the city commercial fairs and celebrations are usually organized.

Shopping 
Buying and wearing new clothes is an important part of the festival. As many people living in the villages are below the poverty line, for them it is often the case that new clothes come only with Dashain. Almost all the shops have festival offers and discounts. This makes shopping more attractive. Clothes have the highest sales during the festival.

Feasts 
Thousands of animals including buffalo, ducks, and rams are slaughtered in Dashain every year. It has been considered an important ritual since it is believed that the goddesses are appeased by such sacrifices. Almost all the temples, especially the Durga and Kali temples, are offered with thousands of sacrifices. Ashtami and Navami are the days when the sacrifices reach a peak. While thousands of animals are sacrificed to appease the goddesses, people also slaughter animals for feasts. Since many feasts and gatherings are organized throughout the fifteen days of the festival, the demand for meat goes up considerably. To meet the demand, the slaughtering of animals becomes considerably high and necessary.

Controversy in Nepal

The festival of Dashain is often  criticized for its animal sacrifice. Many online petitions have been registered on Change.org, calling for a government action against mass slaughter. Driven by the belief that offerings of fresh blood will appease goddess Durga, scores of animals and birds are ritually slaughtered especially in the eighth and ninth day of the festival. Birds and animals that are traditionally eligible for sacrifice include goats, buffaloes, sheep, chickens, and ducks. Some animal activists have called for the use of pumpkins and coconuts, as opposed to birds and animals.

Numerous national luminaries and animal rights activists alike have expressed their concerns over the issue of animal cruelty in the festival. On 3 October 2016, renowned Nepali comedian Hari Bansha Acharya wrote a satirical piece on Nepal Saptahik – entitled "Euta Khasiko Aatmakatha" (Autobiography of a Goat) – in light of "horrendous" exploitation inflicted upon animals during the festival.

Dashain has also become controversial in Nepal's current political climate as several indigenous groups (adivasi janajati) argue that festival has been imposed on them by the state. In an effort to resist what they view as the cultural domination by the Hindu elites that dominate the Nepali state, several organizations (anti-Hindu) have organized a boycott of Dashain. So far those campaigns have had a limited effect across the country. Yet, Dashain and likewise other cultural celebrations are ingrained in Nepalese lifestyle.

See also

 Chhath
 Durga Puja
 Malshree dhun
 Mohani
 Vijayadashami

References

Books

External links

Public holidays in Nepal
Festivals in Nepal
Nepalese culture
Hindu festivals
Culture of Sikkim
Public holidays in Bhutan
Hindu festivals in Nepal
September observances
October observances

fr:Dussehra
ml:വിജയദശമി
te:దసరా
ur:دسہرہ